Dubbo is an electoral district of the Legislative Assembly in the Australian state of New South Wales. It is represented by Dugald Saunders of the National Party.

Dubbo is a regional electorate covering three local government areas, including all of Dubbo Regional Council, Narromine Shire, and the majority of Mid-Western Regional Council. Its major population centres are Dubbo, Narromine, Wellington and Mudgee.

History
It was first created in 1894, abolished in 1904, and then recreated in 1930.

Dubbo has been generally conservative leaning throughout its history, with the Country/National and  parties holding it for most of its lifetime.  The conservative bent grew even stronger during the 1980s and 1990s, and the seat was widely seen as National Party heartland.  This changed in 1999, when Dubbo became one of a number of key National Party seats to fall to rural independents, with the narrow victory of Tony McGrane. He was returned with a much larger majority at the 2003 election, and when he died in 2004, was replaced by another independent, Dawn Fardell, who won the resulting by-election. Fardell was re-elected in 2007 election; only to be comprehensively defeated by the Nationals Troy Grant at the 2011 general election.

However, Labor has not held the seat since 1959, and there is no prospect of Labor retaking it in the foreseeable future. Labor did not field a candidate in the 2004 by-election, and achieved 6.5% of the first preference votes at the 2011 general election.

Members for Dubbo

Election results

Localities 
Localities within the electorate of Dubbo include:

Apple Tree Flat, Apsley, Arthurville, Avisford, Bakers Swamp, Ballimore, Bara, Barneys Reef, Ben Buckley, Beni, Benolong, Beryl, Biraganbil, Birriwa, Bocoble, Bodangora, Bombira, Botobolar, Bournewood, Brocklehurst, Buckaroo, Budgee Budgee, Bundemar, Bungaba, Burroway, Burrundulla, Caerleon, Canadian Lead, Carcalgong, Collingwood, Comobella, Cooyal, Cope, Cross Roads, Crudine, Cudgegong, Cullenbone, Cumbandry, Cundumbul, Curra Creek, Dandaloo, Dripstone, Dubbo, Dunedoo, Elong Elong, Erudgere, Eschol, Euchareena, Eumungerie, Eurimbla, Eurunderee, Farnham, Frog Rock, Galambine, Geurie, Gin Gin, Gollan, Goolma, Goonoo Forest, Grattai, Green Gully, Gulgong, Guntawang, Hargraves, Havilah, Hayes Gap, Home Rule, Kains Flat, Kerrs Creek, Linburn, Loombah, Lue, Maitland Bar, Maryvale, Mebul, Medway, Menah, Meroo, Merotherie, Merotherie, Milroy, Minore, Mogriguy, Montefiores, Mookerawa, Mount Aquila, Mount Arthur, Mount Frome, Mount Knowles, Mudgee, Mullamuddy, Mumbil, Nanima, Narromine, Neurea, North Yeoval, Piambong, Ponto, Putta Bucca, Pyramul, Queens Pinch, Rawsonville, Riverlea, Spicers Creek, Spring Flat, St Fillans, Stony Creek, Stuart Town, Stubbo, Suntop, Tallawang, Tambaroora, Terrabella, Terramungamine, Tomingley, Toongi, Trangie, Triamble, Twelve Mile, Two Mile Flat, Two Mile Flat, Ulan, Ulan, Ullamalla, Walmer, Wambangalang, Wellington, Wilbetree, Windeyer, Wongarbon, Worlds End, Wuuluman, Yarrabin, Yarragal, Yarrawonga.

References

External links
Dubbo and the NSW Government | Our History

Dubbo
Dubbo
1894 establishments in Australia
Dubbo
1904 disestablishments in Australia
Dubbo
1930 establishments in Australia